Marianne "Marjan" Ackermans-Thomas (born 5 April 1942) is a retired Dutch pentathlete. She competed at the 1968 Summer Olympics and finished in 17th place.

References

External links
Meerkamp Vrouwen Periode 1945–1972. atletiekhistorici.nl

1942 births
Living people
Athletes (track and field) at the 1968 Summer Olympics
Dutch pentathletes
Olympic athletes of the Netherlands
Sportspeople from Beverwijk